Al-Wehda SC is a Libyan football and basketball club based in Tripoli, Libya.

Honors
Libyan Cup:
 Winners (1): 1993

Libyan Second Division:
 Winners (1): 2006–07

Performance in CAF competitions
CAF Cup: 1 appearance
1992: Second Round

References

External links
 Team's profile – kooora.com
 Club logo

Wahda Tripoli
Association football clubs established in 1954
Sport in Tripoli, Libya
1954 establishments in Libya